Dehuj may refer to:
 Dehuj, Baft
 Dehuj, Jiroft
 Dehuj, Ravar